Evert "Eef" Gerardus Dolman (22 February 1946 – 12 May 1993) was a Dutch racing cyclist, who won the gold medal in the 100 km team trial at the 1964 Summer Olympics in Tokyo, Japan, alongside Gerben Karstens, Bart Zoet, and Jan Pieterse.  His sporting career began with Apollo Rotterdam. He became Dutch champion in 1967 and 1968, but was later stripped of his 1967 title because of doping.

He said in an interview with the Dutch magazine Wielerrevue that his racing career had been undermined by drug-taking and what he described as the witch-hunt conducted in the first years of drug-testing in the 1960s.

Palmarès 

1964
 Olympic title team time trial
1965
Ronde van Noord-Holland
Ronde van Limburg
1966
 World amateur road race champion
Ronde van Gelderland
Tour de Namur
1967
Stage 6 of Vuelta a España
1968
Goirle
 Dutch National Road Race Championship
Ulestraten
1969
1st stage of Tour de Luxembourg
Mijl van Mares
Monaco
1970
Kortenhoef
1971
Tour of Flanders

See also
 List of Dutch Olympic cyclists

References

External links 

Official Tour de France results for Evert Dolman

1946 births
1993 deaths
Dutch male cyclists
Cyclists at the 1964 Summer Olympics
Olympic cyclists of the Netherlands
Olympic gold medalists for the Netherlands
Cyclists from Rotterdam
Dutch Vuelta a España stage winners
Olympic medalists in cycling
Medalists at the 1964 Summer Olympics
UCI Road World Championships cyclists for the Netherlands
20th-century Dutch people